Stuhlmannium mirabilis is a species of beetle in the family Carabidae, the only species in the genus Stuhlmannium.

References

Licininae
Beetles described in 1894